Trinity Theological College, located in Leederville a suburb of Perth, Western Australia, is an independent evangelical Christian tertiary college. Its courses are accredited through the Australian College of Theology. It is the recognised training college for the Anglican Diocese of North West Australia, the Westminster Presbyterian Church and the Presbyterian Church of Western Australia.

History 
Trinity Theological College was formed at the end of 1998 with the merging of the Perth Centre for Applied Christian Studies (PCACS) and Westminster Theological College (Perth). This followed two years of prayer, planning, and preparations by college boards and principals (Dr Allan Chapple and Dr Stephen Rarig).

Trinity was located at Bull Creek Westminster Presbyterian church from 1998 to 2003. In May 2004 the main campus moved to a purpose-designed premises in Leederville: "Trinity House".

The faithful prayer and financial support of a dedicated group of supporters realised the dream of providing a building that would enable the training ministry to extend its influence throughout Western Australia and the world. The ministry of the College continues to rely on prayer and financial support to help it continue to grow and develop into the future.

Trustees, faculty, staff and students come from a wide cross-section of churches and backgrounds.

Trinity is the recognised training college for the Diocese of North West Australia of the Anglican Church of Australia, the Westminster Presbyterian Church and the Presbyterian Church of Western Australia. Many churches, missionary societies, schools and other ministries send people to be trained at Trinity and employ their graduates.

Courses 
Trinity offers a Certificate of Christian Studies in it own right, with Australian College of Theology courses ranging from undergraduate diplomas to postgraduate degrees.

Facilities 
The main campus, 'Trinity House', is in Leederville 5 kilometres from the Perth CBD.

The library collection has more than 25,000 items.

Notable alumni 
Bishop James Kwang, Bishop of the Chinese Methodist Church in Australia, Perth

References

External links 
 Trinity Theological College
 Australian College of Theology

Australian College of Theology
1998 establishments in Australia
Educational institutions established in 1998
Education in Western Australia
Evangelicalism in Australia
Theological colleges of the Presbyterian Church of Australia
Province of Western Australia